Never a Dull Moment is the fourth studio album by rock musician Rod Stewart. It was released on 21 July 1972; that year it became a UK number-one album (for two weeks) and reached number two on the US Album chart. The track "You Wear It Well", co-written by Stewart and classical guitarist Martin Quittenton, was a smash hit (another UK No. 1; in US No. 13), as well as "Twisting the Night Away", a song originally recorded (and written) by Sam Cooke.

Like many of Stewart's albums from the era, Never a Dull Moment features significant musical contributions from the members of the band Faces. Other guest musicians included Ray Jackson of the band Lindisfarne on mandolin, Spike Heatley on upright bass, Gordon Huntley on steel guitar, Dick Powell on violin and Pete Sears on piano and bass.

"Mama You Been on My Mind" is a cover version of a Bob Dylan song. Stewart's version is one of the songs featured in Nick Hornby's book 31 Songs.

On the 8-track tape and Cassette releases of the album the song "What Made Milwaukee Famous (Has Made a Loser Out of Me)" was on program 2 following "Twistin' the Night Away", but it was not mentioned in the song listing.

"Angel" was written by Jimi Hendrix as a tribute to his mother. Hendrix and Ronnie Wood had shared a flat in the late 1960s, and were both at a Soho club on the night he died.

Track listing

Personnel 
 Rod Stewart – vocals, acoustic guitar
 Ronnie Wood – electric guitar, acoustic guitar, slide guitar, pedal steel guitar, bass guitar
 Ronnie Lane – bass guitar on "True Blue", and "Angel"
 Micky Waller – drums all songs except "True Blue"
 Kenney Jones – drums on "True Blue"
 Ian McLagan – Hammond organ, piano
 Neemoi "Speedy" Aquaye – congas
 Pete Sears – piano on “Italian Girls”, “What Made Milwaukee Famous” (single), bass guitar on “I’d Rather Go Blind”.
 Brian – piano
 Spike Heatley – upright bass
 Dick Powell – violin
 Martin Quittenton – acoustic guitar
 Gordon Huntley – steel guitar
 Ray Jackson – mandolin
 Arrangeables on "Twistin' the Night Away" by Jimmy Horowitz

Charts

Weekly charts

Year-end charts

Certifications

References 

1972 albums
Rod Stewart albums
Mercury Records albums
Albums recorded at Morgan Sound Studios
Albums recorded at Olympic Sound Studios